Roger Touhy (September 18, 1898 – December 16, 1959) was an Irish American mob boss and prohibition-era bootlegger from Chicago, Illinois, in the United States. He is best remembered for having been framed for the 1933 faked kidnapping of gangster John "Jake the Barber" Factor, a brother of cosmetics manufacturer Max Factor Sr. Despite numerous appeals and at least one court ruling freeing him, Touhy spent 26 years in prison. Touhy was released in November 1959, and murdered by the Chicago Outfit less than a month later.

Early life and career

Early years
Roger Touhy was born on September 18, 1898, at 822 S. Robey Street in Chicago, Illinois, to James A. Touhy and his wife, Mary ( Mordan). James was an immigrant from County Sligo, Ireland. Roger was one of eight children, the youngest of six boys, with an older sister and a younger sister. Rarely for the Chicago Police Department at that time, Patrolman James Touhy was known to be fiercely honest and incorruptible, but he was also a strict disciplinarian who beat his children so severely that his neighbors complained. Mary Touhy was a devout Catholic who required her children to attend Mass with her.

The Touhy family lived near Polk Street and South Damen Avenue on Chicago's Near West Side. Roger initially attended local public school in Chicago. In 1908, Mary Touhy died after a stove in the kitchen exploded and caused a fire, after which James Touhy moved his family to Downers Grove, Illinois. The family was Roman Catholic, and Touhy was an altar boy at their church. He attended St. Joseph Catholic School in Downers Grove, graduating from the sixth grade as valedictorian of his class.

All but one of Roger's brothers were engaged in criminal activity. James Touhy Jr. was shot and killed by a police officer during an armed robbery in 1917. John Touhy was killed by members of the Chicago Outfit, then led by Al Capone, in 1927 while engaged in bootlegging. Joe Touhy was killed by Victor Willert, a roadhouse owner, in 1929 after Touhy threatened his life for refusing to buy moonshine from the gang. Tommy "The Terrible" Touhy served six of a 12-year sentence at Indiana State Prison for robbing the L.S. Ayres & Co. department store in Indianapolis, Indiana, in 1924. Paroled in 1930, he served 11 of a 23-year sentence for stealing $78,000 ($ in  dollars) from a U.S. Mail shipment at a Milwaukee, Wisconsin train station on January 3, 1933. Only Eddie Touhy, a bartender, seemed to steer clear of crime.

Legitimate employment
Roger began working full-time for a living at the age of 13. His ham radio hobby enabled him to get a job as a 
telegrapher with Western Union, and he proved so adept that he was soon made manager of the small office where he worked. He was fired in 1915 for expressing support for unionization efforts. Touhy says he spent some time as a union organizer for the Commercial Telegraphers Union of America, but felt the job had no security. He joined the Order of Railroad Telegraphers, which qualified him for a well-paying railroad job. He obtained a position with the Denver and Rio Grande Railroad and moved to Colorado.

The United States entered World War I on April 6, 1917, and Touhy enlisted in the United States Navy in 1918. Touhy did not see combat; rather, the Navy assigned him to a teaching post at Harvard University near Boston, Massachusetts. The college had lent the Navy classroom space, and Touhy taught officers Morse code. For the rest of his life, Touhy tried to impress people by claiming he was at Harvard.

After leaving the Navy, Touhy traveled to Oklahoma with a friend from the Navy. He paid a petroleum engineer a bottle of bootleg corn whiskey to spend a few hours teaching him the fundamentals of petroleum engineering. Touhy bluffed his way into a petroleum engineering job, paying the drilling rig and well mechanics in corn whiskey to do his job. Saving $1,000 ($ in  dollars), he began speculating in oil leases with his Navy friend.

After about a year in Oklahoma, Touhy had made $25,000 ($ in  dollars). He returned to Chicago, and on April 22, 1922, he married 23-year-old Clara Morgan, an Irish American woman he'd met seven years earlier while working for Western Union.

Criminal involvement
Touhy's initial employment after his marriage was legitimate, and included being a successful automobile salesman by day and a taxicab driver by night. He made $50,000 ($ in  dollars) a year selling cars. In 1926, Touhy formed a legitimate trucking firm with his brothers Eddie and Tommy. Touhy's first son, Roger Scott Touhy, was born in 1926 as well. The same year, Touhy moved his family to Des Plaines, Illinois, a suburb of Chicago. Des Plaines was still quite a rural area, and the family lived in a large home on a farm on River Road just north of Maryville Academy.

The Touhy-Kolb bootleg empire
According to Touhy, he began to bootleg immediately after founding his trucking firm. Shortly thereafter, bootlegger Matt Kolb allowed Touhy to buy into his business. Kolb owned a saloon near Tuohy's automobile dealership, and Touhy says he once sold Kolb a vehicle. Kolb had once been part of Al Capone's Chicago Outfit, supplying as much as a third of the beer it sold, but quit as the Outfit became more violent. For an investment of $10,000 ($ in  dollars), Touhy became a partner with Kolb.

Touhy's bootlegging business expanded dramatically. Touhy and Kolb built 10 illegal beer and liquor breweries northwest of Chicago, and built a wooden barrel manufacturing plant in Schiller Park for transporting the goods. Touhy purchased oil trucks and had them painted to look like Texaco vehicles to hide the delivery of his alcohol. He even hired off-duty police officers to drive the trucks to help avoid arrests. Unlike other bootleggers, Touhy and Kolb consulted a chemist, and brewed a high-quality beer.

Demand for Touhy's beer was extremely high. Touhy and Kolb sold their bootleg alcohol to a network of 200 bars, nightclubs, and roadhouses west and northwest of Chicago. They regularly sold 18,000 bottles of beer a week. During summer (the peak season for beer drinking), they could sell an enormous 1,000 barrels of beer a week, making a profit of $50.50 ($ in  dollars) on a $55 barrel.

Touhy and Kolb also got into the slot machine racket in 1926. Although illegal, slot machines were highly popular, and Touhy and Kolb were able to put hundreds of them in drug stores, gas stations, grocery stores, and taverns throughout the area they controlled. The two men grossed $1 million ($ in  dollars) from slot machines alone that first year.

For several years, Touhy avoided problems with law enforcement by becoming one of the best fixers in the Chicago area. Like nearly all bootleggers, he paid extensive bribes to judges, police, and prosecutors, and he supplemented his payments with free shipments of his high-quality beer (which often was more prized than the cash). Touhy also aided law enforcement by keeping bottom-rung gangsters (who were more likely to cause problems for a community) out of Des Plaines, and refused to allow brothels to operate in the northwest and west suburbs of Chicago. He won the grudging respect of the local community for regularly donating large amounts of beer to local civic, fraternal, and social fundraising events, and for buying ice cream for hundreds of children each Sunday.

Rivalry with Capone

By the late 1920s, the Chicago Outfit was ordering hundreds of barrels of beer a week from Touhy and Kolb. At one point, Touhy was selling Capone 800 barrels of beer a week at a discounted price of $37.50 per barrel ($ in  dollars) (making a profit of 488 percent on each barrel).

Capone first tested Touhy's toughness by sending Outfit members Willie Heeney and Frank Rio to meet with Touhy. The men told Touhy that Capone felt the northwestern suburbs were "virgin territory" for brothels, illegal gambling, and taxi dance halls. Touhy's gang was small, so he chose to intimidate Heeney and Rio: he lined his office walls with handguns and rifles, and borrowed submachine guns from the local police. Touhy hired off-duty police officers and local farmers to lounge around the building while armed. While Touhy talked with Humphreys, men would occasionally enter the office, grab a weapon, and casually tell Touhy they were going to kill someone. Touhy would nod in agreement or mumble his approval. Touhy also arranged for a man to call his office every few minutes. Touhy would answer the phone, pretend to listen, and then order someone intimidated or killed. Touhy told Humphreys that he didn't want anything Capone was offering, and to stay out of his territory. Humphreys and Fawcett left convinced that the Touhy gang was large, well-armed, and ruthless and that a gang war would be devastating to the Chicago Outfit. Capone backed down. Word of the meeting spread, and Touhy gained the unlikely nickname "Touhy the Terrible".

A short time later, Capone sent Louis "Little New York" Campagna and Jack "Machine Gun" McGurn to Touhy. They advised Touhy to turn over part of his business to the Chicago Outfit, but Touhy refused. Once more, Touhy "playacted" for the men, who left convinced Touhy was more powerful than he really was.

According to Touhy, he now approached local law enforcement and retailers and told them about Capone's interest in the western suburbs. He asked them to resist Capone's attempt to get them to sell punchboards or buy low-quality beer, and in turn Touhy said he would resist Capone. The appeal worked.

Capone now attempted to lure Touhy into a trap. He sent Francis "Frank Diamond" Maritote, Sam "Golf Bag" Hunt, and Frank Rio to see Touhy again. The playacting did not impress Rio this time, even after Touhy claimed to have 200 prison-toughened thugs in his gang. Touhy, sensing trouble, told the trio that he was hosting a party for all his men that night at The Arch, his Schiller Park roadhouse. Touhy invited Capone, Nitti, and all the other top leaders of the Chicago Outfit to the party. Touhy had no intention of hosting a party; instead, he closed the roadhouse early in the evening and removed all liquor from the premises. Chicago police and Cook County sheriff's men raided the premises that evening, sent there on a tip by Capone.

Capone then laid a second trap. He sent Murray "The Camel" Humphreys to Touhy to suggest an alliance. Humphreys and his driver/bodyguard, James "Red" Fawcett, met with Touhy and asked him to come to Capone's headquarters in Cicero, Illinois, to meet with underboss Frank Nitti and hammer out a deal. Warned by a Capone insider that the Outfit intended to kill him, Touhy told Humphreys that Nitti should come to Schiller Park. When Humphreys threatened Touhy, Touhy pointed a shotgun at him. Humphreys was visibly intimidated, and Touhy sent him back to Nitti, humiliated.

Capone's last attempt to intimidate Touhy came on March 4, 1931, when an Outfit member named Summers visited Touhy and once again proposed bringing brothels, gambling, and taxi dance halls to the northwestern suburbs. Touhy bribed two of his men to take Summers out drinking. They ended up at Capone's Cotton Club in Cicero, where the two men successfully urged Summers to pick a fight with Ralph Capone, who ran the club (and whom Summers did not know). Two federal law enforcement officers drinking at the club came to Ralph's defense, and were disarmed. Touhy's men kept their firearms. Capone desperately needed to return the federally-owned firearms to the Treasury agents, and contacted Touhy. Touhy feigned ignorance of the two men's identity and suggested that Summers knew who they were, but Capone had already had Summers killed. Federal officials raided the Cotton Club on March 12 and again on March 13 looking for the guns, and shut it down.

Capone also began to apply pressure in other ways. Chicago Outfit men began to occasionally travel to the western and northwestern suburbs and engage in short gun fights with Touhy's men.

On April 8, 1931, Anton Cermak was sworn in as mayor of Chicago. As chair of the Cook County Board of Commissioners from 1923 to 1931, Cermak had gotten along very well with Touhy. Cermak had pledged to "clean up" Chicago and get rid of violent gangs. Cermak was allegedly advised that strict enforcement of Prohibition was impossible. A better option was to have a "good gang" like Touhy's take over from the Chicago Outfit, which was not only more violent but also promoting gambling, prostitution, and a wide range of other vices. Cermak then met Touhy and urged him to take over Capone's territory. Touhy, whose gang was relatively small and nonviolent, balked. Cermak then suggested that the Chicago Police Department would assist in putting pressure on the Outfit through raids, arrests, prosecutions, and even killings. Cermak allegedly offered to allow Touhy to take over bootlegging in Chicago if the war was successful. Touhy's men now began engaging in gun battles with Chicago Outfit members within the Chicago city limits.

The alleged alliance between Cermak and Touhy alarmed Al Capone. Some time in the first three months of 1931, while Touhy was vacationing in Florida, Capone's men threatened Matt Kolb with death if he did not pay them $25,000 ($ in  dollars). Kolb did so. Capone then had Kolb kidnapped. Touhy paid a $50,000 ($ in  dollars) ransom to free him. Sensing Kolb was the weak link in the Touhy-Kolb partnership, Capone sent several capos into the northwestern suburbs and seized 40 of Kolb's bars, clubs, and resorts in early May 1931. Kolb's liquor was poured out, his gambling machines destroyed, and the managers told to buy alcohol from Capone in the future. Capone then ordered Matt Kolb killed. Just before 2 A.M. on October 18, 1931, two Capone hitmen murdered Kolb inside Kolb's Club Morton in Morton Grove, Illinois.

After Kolb's death, Touhy lived in fear and surrounded himself with armed guards.

Battle for control of the Chicago labor movement
Touhy's involvement with the labor movement began again in 1929 when Capone approached Touhy with a proposal to take over several Chicago-area locals of the International Brotherhood of Teamsters (IBT). Marcus "Studdy" Looney of Chicago Outfit met with Touhy and showed him a list of various American Federation of Labor (AFL) unions in the area and how much money each of them had in their treasury. The Teamsters were a particular focus of the Outfit. Touhy declined to participate in the scheme. Capone went ahead with the takeovers of the local unions anyway.

The Outfit's attempt to take control of the Teamsters District Council and other local unions began in the fall of 1930. At first, the presidents of the independent Teamsters and other union officials sought help from Touhy and other non-Outfit gangsters. They purchased homes close to Touhy's in Des Plaines in the hope that proximity would discourage assassination attempts. These labor officials began hiring bodyguards, many of whom were ex-gangsters. As Touhy told a federal court in 1952, William Rooney, president of Sheet Metal Workers union; Patrick J. "Paddy" Burrell, vice president of the IBT; and Art Wallace, secretary-treasurer of the Painters union met with Touhy in 1931 and asked him to hold on to $125,000 ($ in  dollars) which they had raised as a fund to fight Outfit takeovers. Touhy claims he retained the money until Burrell and Jerry Horan, president of the Building Service Employees International Union, retrieved it some time later.

Thomas J. Courtney, who became Cook County State's Attorney in 1933, was ostensibly a reformer who professed a desire to root out organized crime influence in the labor movement. Courtney had little interest in doing so, intending to use his defense of collective bargaining as a means of seeking higher office. Modern historians agree that, behind the scenes, Courtney engaged in collusion with gang leaders. The Chicago District Council of Teamsters (an umbrella group for Teamster locals in the area) had broken away from the IBT in 1905, and now Courtney colluded with the AFL and IBT to force the independent District Council back into the IBT. Courtney's chief investigator, Chicago Police captain Daniel Gilbert, became the point-man for Courtney's efforts. Under the agreement, Courtney had to approve of the leaders of IBT locals in the area, and was permitted to bar certain individuals from membership.

Courtney faced a Chicago Outfit in disarray. When Al Capone was imprisoned on October 24, 1931, only two of the Chicago Outfit's top 16 leaders remained out of prison. Lower-level mobsters now fought for control of the Chicago Outfit. Irish gangster and Outfit member George "Red" Barker had been in control of a number of union locals in Chicago since 1928, and now began using this base of power to put pressure on the Sicilian mobsters who had dominated the Outfit under Capone. Barker was murdered in June 1932. The press reported at the time that the Sicilian faction was responsible, although labor historian David Scott Witwer says someone from Touhy's gang was the likely culprit. After Barker's death, Capt. Gilbert began putting Courtney-approved leaders in charge of the "liberated" local unions. In retaliation for the Barker murder, the Outfit killed Burrell in July 1932.

Touhy was aware of the collusion between Courtney and the IBT to dominate the District Council. After the death of Barker, Courtney installed a pro-IBT president as president of the Coal Haulers, and removed Looney as president of the Excavating, Grading, and Dump Drivers. On February 2, 1933, Tommy Touhy and other members of the Touhy gang attacked James "Fur" Sammons, a hitman for the O'Donnell Gang, and several others involved in labor racketeering, but managed to neither kill nor wound anyone. Worried that Touhy's attack might embolden union leaders to resist the Outfit, Frank Nitti ordered a series of vandalisms and bombings that intimidated business owners and unions alike into remaining under the Outfit's control.

The Cullen–Harrison Act, which legalized the sale in the United States of beer and wine with an alcohol content of 3.2% (by weight), went into effect on April 7, 1933. Organized crime sought to retain its profits by imposing a protection racket on now-legal brewers. On April 8, the Prima Brewing Company plant in Chicago was bombed, and there was some suggestion that Touhy (not the Chicago Outfit) had planted the explosive device.

Touhy's last known involvement with the labor movement came in April 1933. Early that month, Horan and Arthur Wallace (secretary-treasurer of the Chicago District Council of the Painters Union) met with Touhy and told him they were giving in to the Chicago Outfit's demands. Horan asked Capt. Gilbert to set up a meeting with the Outfit, and turned his union over to the mob. Wallace did the same. On Friday, April 28, 1933, a group of men wielding machine guns entered the Teamsters District Council headquarters building at 637 S. Ashland Avenue in Chicago at about 8:30 A.M. and held about 80 people hostage for three hours. The leader of the gunmen declared their purpose was to break the hold of Murray "The Camel" Humphreys, William "Klondike" O'Donnell, and "Three Finger" Jack White on the Teamster unions. When the three gangsters did not appear as expected after three hours, the gunmen kidnapped Fred Sass, business agent of the Ash Wagon Drivers Union, and Morris Goldberg, clerk for the Moving Van Drivers Union. Someone later communicated with Frank Goldberg, Morris' brother, and assured him Morris was uninjured. The gunmen held the two men over the weekend, apparently in the belief that Sass and Goldberg (who was O'Donnell's brother-in-law) knew where the three Outfit members were. Sass and Goldberg repeatedly said they did not know. The duo was told to quit their union jobs or face assassination, and were released around dawn on Monday, May 1. The Chicago Tribune initially declared that Roger Touhy himself led the kidnappers, but a few days later reported only that "members of the Touhy gang" had committed the kidnapping. According to one theory, the Touhy gang had seen revenues dry up with the repeal of Prohibition, and were seeking to take over unions themselves as a way of generating income. Another theory was that the Touhy gang had been hired by the IBT, which was seeking to wrest back control of the District Council. A third theory held that Roger Touhy was seeking to take over unions in an attempt to raise money to pay for the medical care of his brother Tommy, who had recently been partially paralyzed.

Hamm kidnapping charge

Conceiving the Hamm kidnapping
Alvin Karpis, Fred Barker, and Fred's mother took up residence in St. Paul, Minnesota, in late December 1931. There, Alvin and Fred formed a new incarnation of the Barker–Karpis gang. Local gangster and casino owner Jack Peifer put the Barker-Karpis gang up in a rented cottage in White Bear Lake, Minnesota, on the outskirts of St. Paul. Kidnapping had become a lucrative enterprise for American gangsters in the past year. The number of high-profile kidnappings reached 27 in 1933, more than double the number in 1932. It was safer than bank robbery but just as lucrative. In early June 1933, Peifer met with Barker-Karpis gang leaders and persuaded them to kidnap William Hamm Jr., president of the Hamm's Brewing Company and heir to the Hamm family fortune.

The rationale for kidnapping Hamm, Peifer said, was the $100,000 ransom ($ in  dollars) the gang could expect to collect.

In fact, the Barker-Karpis gang was being manipulated into kidnapping Hamm so that Roger Touhy could be framed for the crime and eliminated as competition for the Chicago Outfit. Sources vary widely as to who conceived of framing Touhy. It may have been Outfit head Frank Nitti, but the idea may have come from Murray "The Camel" Humphreys, the Outfit's chief fixer and labor racketeer. Tom Brown, the corrupt ex-chief of police of St. Paul, or Chicago Police captain Daniel Gilbert may also have conceived of the plot. Crime historian Jay Nash says the idea came jointly from Peifer, Harry Sawyer, and Fred Goetz ( George "Shotgun" Ziegler), a Chicago Outfit assassin. Historian Julie A. Thompson, however, attributes it only to Peifer.

Hamm and Factor kidnappings
The Barker–Karpis gang kidnapped Hamm shortly after 12:15 PM on June 15, 1933, as he walked from the brewery to his home in St. Paul. Four men assisted Karpis and Barker in kidnapping Hamm: Arthur "Doc" Barker (Fred's brother), Byron Bolton, Charles "Old Fitz" Fitzgerald, and Fred Goetz. Brown, still a detective with the St. Paul police, kept the Barker-Karpis gang apprised of the FBI and St. Paul police investigations into the kidnapping. The Hamm family paid the $100,000 ransom on June 17, and Hamm was freed at dawn on June 19.

Melvin Purvis was the FBI Special Agent in Charge of the investigation into the Hamm kidnapping. From the beginning, Purvis believed that the Touhy gang committed the kidnapping. Purvis may have convinced himself of this, but it is also documented that Capt. Daniel Gilbert told Purvis that the Chicago police had information that Touhy was responsible.

On June 30, gangster and stock manipulator John "Jake the Barber" Factor disappeared. Factor was facing extradition to the United Kingdom for trial on charges of stock fraud. Factor conceived of the kidnapping as a way to avoid extradition, as American law enforcement and prosecutors would need to keep him in the U.S. as legal proceedings against the kidnappers went forward. The British consul in the United States declared the kidnapping a farce.

Factor's disappearance was convenient for the Outfit: Not only could police blame the Factor "kidnapping" on Touhy, but Factor (himself an affiliate of The Outfit) could accuse Touhy as well. Capt. Gilbert told Purvis that he was convinced Touhy was responsible. Gilbert publicly accused Touhy of engineering Factor's abduction on July 3, and repeated the claim several times to the press. Gilbert later claimed that he had 25 law enforcement officers trying to find Touhy in the days after Factor's kidnapping, but could not find him. Factor reappeared on July 12, allegedly after payment of a $70,000 ransom ($ in  dollars). The same day, Gilbert's men arrested two members of the Touhy gang for kidnapping Factor.

Arrest and indictment
Unconcerned about Gilbert's public statements, Touhy decided to go on a mid-July fishing trip in southern Wisconsin with fellow gangsters Edward "Father Tom" McFadden, Gustave "Gloomy Gus" Schaefer, and Willie Sharkey. While returning to Chicago on July 19, Tuohy's car skidded off the road in misty, rainy weather and struck a utility pole. Touhy reported the accident and attempted to pay for the pole. Police discovered some weapons in Touhy's vehicle, and arrested the four on concealed weapons charges. Purvis drove to Wisconsin, and took Touhy and his three associates to Minnesota without an extradition order.

The FBI falsely claimed to have an "ironclad case" against Touhy. Taxicab driver Leo J. Allison failed to identify any of the four men as the person who paid him $2 to take a ransom note to the Hamm family. The four men were taken to Hamm's brewery office in secret, and Hamm failed to identify them as his kidnappers. Unable to link Touhy to the Factor kidnapping, the four men were sent back to Elkhorn to face weapons charges. Only then did Purvis claim he had four eyewitnesses connecting Touhy and his men to the Hamm kidnapping. Touhy could have sought a writ of habeas corpus, as Purvis decline to provide the names of his eyewitnesses to a federal court. To discourage this, Purvis added a charge of conspiracy to kidnap, and indicated he would keep adding charges to prevent any release of Touhy. With little evidence on which to hold Touhy, FBI agents beat Touhy brutally and did not let him sleep in an attempt to wring a confession from him.

The federal court scheduled a hearing on Touhy's motion for summary judgment on August 14. Federal agents made a series of wild and inaccurate claims which bolstered their case in public. The FBI said it had been investigating Touhy for two years already, and had intensified their focus on him after enactment of the Federal Kidnapping Act on June 22, 1932. Federal law enforcement officials now claimed that Touhy had kidnapped people in Kansas City, Missouri; Denver, Colorado; and Minneapolis and St. Paul, Minnesota, and had operated a vast kidnap ring operating across the entire Midwestern United States. The United States Department of Justice reiterated its claim that the case against Touhy was "ironclad". FBI agents told the press that Touhy was a "callous killer; cruel by nature and devoid of any human attributes; driven by an insane desire for gangland power, which makes him absolutely ruthless and more deadly than a viper". They claimed he had a gang of more than 100 killers, "a loosely knit band of the most notorious desperadoes in the country, most of them fugitives from justice". Touhy, they said, led "a reign of terror" and "boasted that the law could not touch him" FBI agents also claimed that Touhy was so vicious that even other gangsters called him "America's Menace".

On August 8, the Justice Department convened a federal grand jury to hear evidence regarding an indictment against Touhy and the other three men on charges of kidnapping, conspiracy to kidnap, and interstate transportation of a person held for ransom. Testifying before the grand jury were the arresting officers from Elkhorn, the Walworth County sheriff, three Chicago police officers, and William Hamm, among others. On August 12, 1933, all four men were indicted by grand jury on charges of kidnapping, conpsiracy, and interstate transportation. A grand jury indictment did not require that any accusatory evidence be revealed to the defendants or the court, quashing Touhy's habeas corpus effort.

Pre-trial activities in the Hamm kidnapping
Roger Touhy and his co-defendants were among the first people to be prosecuted under Federal Kidnapping Act. L.L. Drill, the United States District Attorney for St. Paul, now admitted the case against Touhy was thin at first, but he was "fairly confident" that now it had "nothing lacking". Dissatisfied with Drill's preparation and handling of the case, United States Attorney General Homer Cummings replaced him with Special Assistant to the Attorney General Joseph B. Keenan. Keenan had successfully convicted George "Machine Gun" Kelly and three others for the kidnapping of oil man Charles F. Urschel, and his experience was believed to be critical to convicting Touhy.

The FBI now developed evidence of Touhy's innocence. Alvin Karpis, "Doc" Barker, and George Fitzgerald had left their fingerprints on the ransom notes given to the Hamm family. The FBI Technical and Research Laboratory, established in the fall of 1932, had only just developed a technique to lift fingerprints from paper. This technique was now used to lift the Karpis gang's prints from the ransom notes on September 6, 1933.

Despite evidence of the involvement of the Barker-Karpis gang, law enforcement continued to press their case against Touhy, McFadden, Schaefer, and Sharkey. Touhy was indicted for leading a $234,000 ($ in  dollars) mail robbery in Sacramento, California, in February 1933. Police in Nebraska believed Touhy and Sharkey led a $51,000 ($ in  dollars) bank robbery in Grand Island in 1932. Schaefer and Sharkey, along with Frank "Blackie" McKee and "Silent Jim" Ryan (two other alleged members of the Touhy gang), were indicted for a mail robbery in Minneapolis in January 1933. Alleged Touhy associates Gene Thomas ( Frank McGee) and George W. "Red" Kerr were indicted for participating in a $100,000 ($ in  dollars) mail robbery in Milwaukee in January 1933.

Hamm trial
Judge Matthew M. Joyce of the United States District Court for the District of Minnesota presided over the Touhy trial. The lead prosecutor was Joseph B. Keenan. The nine jurors were seated on November 9, 1933.

Keenan's star witness was William Hamm. Hamm identified McFadden as one of his kidnappers on the trial's first day, and then recanted his testimony the next day. When asked by the prosecution to identify Willie Sharkey as one of his kidnappers, Hamm could not do so. He was able to testify about a Wisconsin road sign he saw, which the prosecution said put the place of his imprisonment in Wisconsin. Keenan also called Daniel Rush to the stand, but Rush, who had seen the kidnapping from his home, was not able to identify any of the kidnappers. When pressed, Rush could only say that Sharkey "resembled" the driver of the kidnap car. Taxicab driver Leo Allison proved so reluctant to testify that Keenan had to ask the court for permission to treat Allison as a hostile witness. Only after extensive questioning did Allison admit that the man who'd given him the ransom note resembled McFadden. Two other prosecution eyewitnesses, dentist Dr. Horace C. La Bissoniere and drug store owner Clarence J. Thomas, also testified that Touhy "resembled" the man who left ransom note in Thomas' drug store. Neither could not positively identify him, however.

The prosecution had better luck from two other eyewitnesses, however. Printer Walter Bowick, who was in the drug store when one of the Hamm ransom notes was delivered, positively identified Touhy as the man who delivered the ransom note. Farm hand Charles Carlson positively identified Touhy, McFadden, and Schaefer as the men he saw loitering near the spot where the ransom money was left. Carlson stuck to his testimony despite strong defense cross-examination. Toward the end of the government's case, various law enforcement officers testified about the weapons found in the Touhy car, although none mentioned a pistol converted into a machine gun. Elkhorn police also testified about the "kidnapping gear" they found in the car, which included a sash, a pair of rubber boots, and some bandages. The prosecution rested on November 16.

Jake Factor arrived in Minneapolis during the trial at the request of federal prosecutors. He never took the witness stand. Factor did, however, give almost daily interviews with the press on the courthouse steps in which he accused Touhy of kidnapping and torturing him.

The defense opened its case on November 17. Three and a half days were spent reading into the record depositions from a wide range of individuals who claimed to have seen Touhy, McFadden, Schaefer, and Sharkey nowhere near Minneapolis during the Hamm kidnapping. Defense attorney Thomas McMeekin attempted to introduce extensive evidence that Walter Bowick was an inveterate liar who had fled town after his prosecution testimony. Judge Joyce disallowed the evidence, arguing that it should have been raised during cross-examination. A defense effort to discredit Carlson on the grounds of witness coaching was rejected on the same grounds.

Touhy's defense relied on an alibi for June 15 and 16. The alibi was provided in part by Des Plaines lawyer Vincent Connor and his client Gus A. Palmquist. Both men said they met with Touhy on the night of June 16 when drug store ransom note was delivered, and Connor said he'd telephoned Touhy at Touhy's home on June 15. Telephone records supported Connor's testimony. Connor and Edward J. Meany, a Des Plaines realtor and insurance broker, also testified that they had met with Touhy in Des Plaines on June 15. Local police arrested both Connor and Meany as they left the courtroom, claiming they had violated a local ordinance against registering in a hotel under an assumed name. Judge Joyce was outraged when he learned of it, and freed both men. Touhy's co-defense attorney, William Scott Stewart, called the two men's imprisonment an "old trick" to intimidate defense witnesses.

Gus Schaefer's defense also rested on an alibi. He claimed he was at a motel in King City, California, the week of the Hamm kidnapping. In addition to depositions from the motel clerks, postcards postmarked sent by Schaefer to his wife from California and Wyoming on June 21 and 22 were introduced as evidence as well. Two handwriting experts testified that Schaefer had written the postcards. A prosecution attempt to impugn their testimony by comparing prison letters to the postcards failed when the experts pointed out the different writing instruments used.

Touhy's wife, Clara testified for the defense regarding certain "kidnapping" items found in Touhy's car. The "sash cord" was a clothes line rope her children used to play with, she said. The "bandages" were rags used to clean up the car when her children became carsick, and the rubber boots were hers.

The defense rested on November 25, declining to provide alibis for McFadden or Sharkey.

The government had intended to recall William Hamm to the stand as part of its rebuttal and have him identify his kidnappers by their voices alone, but never did so. The prosecution attempted to call Jake Factor to the stand, claiming Factor would identify the four men as his kidnappers. It also attempted to bring in a new witness, Richard Gustafson, to testify that he had seen Touhy and his men loitering about the Hamm brewery for three days prior to kidnapping. Judge Joyce denied both requests on the grounds that these witnesses should have been called during the prosecution's original case. The government then rested on November 25.

The jury was out for just six and a half hours. On November 28, the jury acquitted all four men of William Hamm's kidnapping.

Factor kidnapping trial
On July 21, 1933, shortly after Touhy's arrest in Elkhorn, police secretly arranged for a lineup of Touhy, McFadden, Schaeffer, and Sharkey and brought Jake Factor in to identify them as his kidnappers. He failed to recognize any of the men.

Factor now told police that his kidnappers were demanding even more money or they would kidnap him again. Factor agreed to allow FBI agent Melvin Purvis to tap his telephone, and Purvis listened in on a number of the demands for more cash. Purvis told Factor to arrange for a new payment, and the FBI decided to set a trap for anyone who showed up at the ransom drop site. The ransom was delivered by two undercover police officers in St. Paul on August 15. Basil "The Owl" Banghart and Martin "Ice Wagon" O'Connor ( Charles Conners) showed up at the location. The two gangsters realized it was a trap, and shot their way clear even though more than 300 FBI and local law enforcement officers surrounded them and two law enforcement spotter planes circled overhead to track their getaway vehicle.

Law enforcement continued to build their case against Touhy as the Hamm kidnapping trial went forward. On September 15, Chicago Police Capt. Dan Gilbert claimed several eyewitnesses saw three members of the Touhy gang loitering about the Dells Roadhouse where Factor was kidnapped. On November 9, a grand jury indicted Hugh Basil Banghart ( Larry Green), Charles "Ice Wagon" Conners ( Eugene Crotty), and August John Lamar ( Albert J. Kator,  Louis La Mar) for participating in the Factor kidnapping. Banghart was captured in Baltimore, Maryland, on February 11. Arrested with him was Isaac "Ike" Costner.

Immediately after Touhy's acquittal for the Hamm kidnapping, federal authorities arrested Touhy, McFadden, Schaefer, and Sharkey on charges of kidnapping Factor. Schaefer and Sharkey were also arrested for robbing the mail in Milwaukee in January 1933. Willie Sharkey, who had twice exhibited irrational behavior during the Hamm trial, committed suicide by hanging on November 30.

Touhy's trial in the kidnapping of Jake Factor opened on January 16, 1934. Thomas Courtney, Minnesota state's attorney prosecuting the case, convinced President Franklin D. Roosevelt to not deport Factor in the interest of law enforcement. The prosecution called six eyewitnesses who claimed they saw Touhy and his co-defendants kidnap Factor. Factor himself testified at the trial. Now claiming that his blindfold had slipped one day, he accused Touhy of being his kidnapper. Under cross-examination, Factor was confronted with the fact that he'd failed to identify any of the four co-defendants in July 1933. Factor now claimed that he'd been told not to by Capt. Daniel Gilbert. Touhy was able to provide an alibi for the night of Factor's kidnapping, with several neighbors testifying that he had sat on his front porch conversing. The jury deadlocked, and a mistrial was declared on February 2, 1934.

A second trial began on February 13, 1934. Charges were inexplicably dropped against Connors, and charges against McFadden dropped as nol pressed. Banghart and Costner were brought to Chicago to testify in the case. Costner turned state's evidence and completely corroborated Factor's accusations. Banghart testified for the defense. Banghart claimed that Jake Factor had recruited him and others to fake Factor's kidnapping as a way of helping Factor avoid deportation, and Banghart was paid $50,000 for his trouble. Factor and others then began framing Touhy and his gang for the kidnapping. A police officer who saw Factor minutes after he claimed to be freed claimed Factor was clean-shaven and his clothes in good appearance (even though Factor said he'd slept in his clothes for nearly two weeks and not been allowed to shower or shave). The press reported that the judge and jury giggled at Banghart's testimony, and that even Touhy's defense attorney hid a smile at how ridiculous it seemed. The jury convicted Touhy and his co-defendants in just four hours, and deliberated the penalty for another six. Deciding against death, the jury imposed a life sentence on all three men. They would be eligible for parole in 33 years.

Basil Banghart was tried separately in the kidnapping of Jake Factor. He was convicted on March 13, 1934, and sentenced to 99 years in prison as well. The day he was convicted, Charles Connors was found murdered (allegedly by gangland thugs) in the Forest Preserve area of Cook County, Illinois.

Incarceration

Appeals
Touhy was incarcerated at Stateville Correctional Center in Illinois. Touhy immediately filed an appeal. Over the next eight years, he spent most of his bootlegger's fortune on legal fees.

On October 9, 1942, Touhy and six other men escaped from Stateville prison. After a month, Touhy and the others were discovered living in a Chicago boarding house. Touhy and three others surrendered peacefully. The remaining two escapees tried to fight their way out and were killed. Touhy re-entered Stateville on December 31, 1942, and was sentenced to an additional 199 years in prison for the escape.

In 1944, 20th Century Fox released a semi-biographical and highly fictionalized film based on Touhy's life, title Roger Touhy, Gangster. Touhy successfully sued the studio for defamation of character (after six years, he won a judgment of $15,000), but Fox was able to distribute the film overseas without legal repercussions.

On August 9, 1954, Federal District Court Judge John Barnes set Touhy free. The ruling was the culmination of an appeal Touhy began in 1948. The Court found that Capt. Gilbert had induced Costner to perjur himself, that Gilbert had held back critical evidence of Touhy's innocence, that Courtney (now a state circuit judge) had presumably had knowledge of Costner's perjury, that multiple Illinois state attorneys had engaged in other prosecutorial misconduct, and that it was now widely known that Factor's kidnapping had been faked. The State of Minnesota appealed the ruling, arguing that Touhy had not exhausted his state appeals before filing his federal appeal. Touhy was released on August 10, 1954, but the United States Court of Appeals for the Seventh Circuit ordered him returned to prison after just 48 hours of freedom while the appeal was pending. On August 30, the Seventh Circuit declined Touhy's bid for habeas corpus, ruling he should remain in prison until the state's appeal was fully heard. The U.S. Supreme Court declined to hear Touhy's appeal on February 14, 1955, and did not accept his writ of habeas corpus.

Release
While the state's appeal was still pending, Governor William Stratton commuted Touhy's two sentences on July 31, 1957. Stratton reduced the 99-year sentence to 72 years, and reduced the 199-year sentence to three years. Touhy won parole on the kidnapping charge on February 20, 1958. Touhy's three-year sentence for escape began running after his kidnapping parole. He was eligible for parole after serving a third of the sentence, and was granted parole on November 12, 1959. Touhy left Statesville Prison on November 24, 1959, having served exactly 25 years and nine months. He lived with his sister, Ethel Alesia, at 125 N. Lotus Avenue in Chicago.

Touhy's autobiography, The Stolen Years, was published in the fall of 1959. John Factor sued Touhy for libel for the statements published in the book.

Death

At 10:30 P.M. on December 16, 1959, Touhy and Walter Miller, a retired Chicago police detective who served as his bodyguard, were gunned down as they entered the Alesia house. Two or three men stepped out of shadows as Touhy and Miller mounted the steps to the front door. Miller identified himself as a police officer, and the men pulled 12 gauge shotguns from beneath their overcoats. Touhy was struck in the left leg above the knee, and in the right leg below the knee. Miller was shot three times in the arms and legs. Miller was able to pull his revolver and fire five shots. Miller was taken to Loretto Hospital in critical condition. Touhy was taken to St. Anne's Hospital, where he died an hour later on the operating table from loss of blood. He received last rites a few minutes before he died.

As Touhy was moved into an oxygen tent, he told medical and police bystanders, "I've been expecting it. The bastards never forget."

Clara Touhy and her son Thomas buried Roger Touhy in a quiet, secret graveside service at Mount Carmel Cemetery in Hillside, Illinois, on Friday, December 18. No clergy or police were present.

Personal life
Roger Touhy claimed he ran afoul of the law only twice before the Hamm kidnapping case. The first time was when he received a traffic ticket for speeding in Chicago, and the second was when a court in Florida found him guilty for discharging a firearm on his property.

On April 22, 1922, Roger married 23-year-old Clara Morgan, an Irish American telegrapher. The couple had two children: Roger Scott Jr. (born about 1925) and Thomas (born about 1927). Touhy claimed to have sent his children to college while in prison, one attending the University of Florida and the other Stetson University. Both worked in the construction industry for a time, but by 1959 Thomas was working as a police officer and going to law school.

All three family members lived under assumed names in Forest Park, Illinois, at the time of Touhy's release.

At one time, Touhy owned a small farm and home in Des Plaines, Illinois, as well as a home on a large piece of property in Florida. While in prison, Touhy sued 20th Century Fox for libeling him in the motion picture Roger Touhy, Gangster. The parties settled out of court, with Touhy receiving $15,000 in damages. At the time of his death, however, Touhy had no property, and only $35,000 in cash and some furniture in storage. His wife and children relied solely on the potential royalties from his autobiography for income.

Post-death legal cases
Jake Factor's libel suit against Touhy was dismissed on account of Touhy's death. Factor then sued autobiography co-author Ray Brennan, KCOP-TV, KCOP reporter Tom Duggan, and the two publishers of Touhy's book for a combined $4 million for libel in January 1960. The outcome of that case is not known.

In August 1961, Clara and Thomas Touhy filed a $2 million defamation and libel suit against CBS for airing a program about Roger Touhy that included their names. The outcome of that case is not known.

In 1979, Roger Touhy Jr. filed suit against 20th Century Fox for breaching the 1949 agreement between the studio and Roger Touhy. The son claimed the agreement barred Fox from distributing the motion picture Roger Touhy, Gangster in the United States. A court found in favor of 20th Century Fox.

Legal legacy
Touhy filed a habeas corpus proceeding in federal District Court against Ragen, the warden of Stateville Prison, alleging he was restrained in violation of the Due Process Clause. As part of this proceeding, in 1949 he subpoenaed FBI agent George McSwain to provide documents showing his kidnapping conviction was based on conspiracy and fraud. McSwain refused, citing Justice Department policy. While the District Court held McSwain in contempt for defying the subpoena, the 7th Circuit Court of Appeals and the US Supreme Court disagreed, both holding that McSwain's refusal was legal.
Thereafter, the proper protocols for subpoenaing a federal agent to appear in court have variously been known as Touhy regulations, Touhy letters, or Touhy requests.

References
Notes

Citations

Bibliography

External links
Hunt for Roger "The Terrible" Touhy and his gang at FBI.gov

1898 births
1959 deaths
American crime bosses
American gangsters
American gangsters of Irish descent
Burials at the Bishop's Mausoleum, Mount Carmel Cemetery (Hillside)
Deaths by firearm in Illinois
Federal Bureau of Investigation misconduct
Gangsters from Chicago
Murdered American gangsters of Irish descent
Organized crime memoirists
Prohibition-era gangsters
People murdered by the Chicago Outfit
People murdered in Illinois
Male murder victims
United States Navy personnel of World War I
United States Navy sailors
Wrongful convictions